The 2001 Samoa rugby union tour of Europe was a series of matches played in November 2001 in Ireland and Italy by Samoa national rugby union team.

Results 
'Scores and results list Samoa's points tally first.

References 
 
 

2001 rugby union tours
2001
rugby union
2001 in Oceanian rugby union
2001–02 in European rugby union
2001–02 in Irish rugby union
2001–02 in Italian rugby union
2001
2001
2001